Thaumaturgy is the purported capability of a magician to work magic or other paranormal events or a saint to perform miracles. It is sometimes translated into English as wonderworking.

A practitioner of thaumaturgy is a "thaumaturge", "thaumaturgist", "thaumaturgus", "miracle worker", or "wonderworker". A 'saint', being one who is variably defined as having an exceptional degree of holiness, enlightenment, or likeness or closeness to God, may be claimed to have performed miracles; these generally being defined as exceptional events or deeds not within the normative means of natural or human power, instead being of some supernatural or preternatural manner. Although the definition of a 'miracle', like the definition of a 'saint', will vary yet further among separate religions, sects, and schools.

Etymology 
The word thaumaturgy derives from Greek  thaûma, meaning "miracle" or "marvel" (final t from genitive thaûmatos) and  érgon, meaning "work".

Buddhism 

In the introduction of his translation of the "Spiritual Powers (神通 Jinzū)" chapter of Dōgen's Shōbōgenzō, Carl Bielefel refers to the powers developed by adepts of Buddhist meditation as belonging to the "thaumaturgical tradition". These powers, known as siddhi or abhijñā, were ascribed to the Buddha and subsequent disciples. Legendary monks like Bodhidharma, Upagupta, Padmasambhava, and others were depicted in popular legends and hagiographical accounts as wielding various supernatural powers.

Christianity 

In Greek writings, the term thaumaturge referred to several Christian saints. The word is usually translated into English as "wonderworker": a saint through whom God works miracles, not just occasionally, but as a matter of course. Famous ancient Christian thaumaturges include Gregory Thaumaturgus (c. 213–270), Saint Menas of Egypt (285–c. 309), Saint Nicholas (270–343), Anthony of Padua (1195–1231), Philomena (  300 (?)), Ambrose of Optina (1812–1891), Gerard Majella (1726–1755) and John of Kronstadt (1829–1908). The bishop of Fiesole, Andrew Corsini of the Carmelites (1302–1373), was also called a thaumaturge during his lifetime. The seventeenth-century Irish Franciscan editor, John Colgan, called the three early Irish saints, Patrick, Brigid, and Columba, thaumaturges in his Acta Triadis Thaumaturgae (Louvain, 1647).

Hinduism

Godman is a colloquial term used in India for a type of charismatic guru. They usually have a high-profile presence, and are capable of attracting attention and support from large sections of the society. Godmen also sometimes claim to possess paranormal powers, such as the ability to heal, the ability to see or influence future events, and the ability to read minds.

Islam 

Miracles in the Qur'an can be defined as supernatural interventions in the life of human beings. According to this definition, miracles are present "in a threefold sense: in sacred history, in connection with the Islamic prophet Muhammad himself and in relation to revelation". The Qur'an does not use the technical Arabic word for miracle (muʿjiza), literally meaning "that by means of which [the Prophet] confounds, overwhelms, his opponents". It rather uses the term āyah "sign". The term Ayah is used in the Qur'an in the above mentioned threefold sense: it refers to the "verses" of the Qur'an (believed to be the divine speech in human language, presented by Muhammad as his chief miracle); as well as to miracles of it and the signs (particularly those of creation).

Judaism

Hermetic Qabalah 

In the Hermetic Qabalah mystical tradition, a person titled a magician has the power to make subtle changes in higher realms, which in turn produce physical results. For instance, if a Magician made slight changes in the world of formation (Olam Yetzirah), such as within the sephiroth of Yesod upon which Malkuth (the material realm) is based and within which all former sephiroth (Sefirot) are brought together, then these alterations would appear in the world of action (Olam Assiah).

Magic 
In the 16th century, the word thaumaturgy entered the English language meaning miraculous or magical powers. The word was first anglicized and used in the magical sense in John Dee's book Mathematicall Praeface to Euclid's Elements (1570). He mentions an "art mathematical" called "thaumaturgy... which giveth certain order to make strange works, of the sense to be perceived and of men greatly to be wondered at".

In Dee's time, "the Mathematicks" referred not merely to the abstract computations associated with the term today, but to physical mechanical devices which employed mathematical principles in their design. These devices, operated by means of compressed air, springs, strings, pulleys or levers, were seen by unsophisticated people (who did not understand their working principles) as magical devices which could only have been made with the aid of demons and devils.

By building such mechanical devices, Dee earned a reputation as a conjurer "dreaded" by neighborhood children. He complained of this assessment in his "Mathematicall Praeface":

Philosophy 
In his book entitled, The Gift of Death, deconstructionist philosopher Jacques Derrida refers to philosophy as thaumaturgy. The idea is taken from the fifth essay of Jan Patočka's work, Heretical Essays in the History of Philosophy Derrida's reading is based on a deconstruction of the origin of the concepts of responsibility, faith, and gift.

In popular culture 

The term thaumaturgy is used in various novels and games as a synonym for magic, a particular sub-school (often mechanical) of magic, or as the "science" of magic.
 Thaumaturgy is defined as the "science" or "physics" of magic by Isaac Bonewits in his 1971 Real Magic that he turned into a RPG reference called Authentic Thaumaturgy (1978, 1998, 2005).  This definition has been used in Role Playing Games (RPGs) such as GURPS (Generic Universal RolePlaying System), novels such as China Miéville's Perdido Street Station, and real world works such as Marcus Cordey's Magical Theory and Tradition.  GURPS also uses the term Thaumatology.
 Thaumaturgy is often used as a name for the magic in Terry Pratchett's Discworld novels. The word also lends itself to the "thaum", the basic unit of magical energy.
 In Lyndon Hardy's Magics trilogy, thaumaturgy is one of the five disciplines of magic. It figures most prominently in the first book, Master of the Five Magics.
 In the roleplaying game Dungeons & Dragons the thaumaturgist is a prestige class which specifically summons outsiders. Additionally, thaumaturgy is the name of a cantrip (a level 0 spell) in fifth edition. It can do simple things such as create harmless tremors, make a window slam open or a candle flicker.
 In White Wolf Publishing's role-playing game, Vampire: The Masquerade, thaumaturgy is a magical Discipline encompassing the Hermetic style of blood-magic which the Tremere Clan converted from their old practices when they became vampires.
 In the Elder Scrolls games Daggerfall and Battlespire, thaumaturgy is a character skill, which is loosely defined as "focus[ing] on manipulating known forces and objects within their natural laws".
 In Diablo (video game) one of the 26 shrines found throughout the labyrinth is known as a Thaumaturgic Shrine.  In a single player game, this shrine has the effect of refilling all the chests in the current level.
 In Final Fantasy XIV, thaumaturge is the title of a playable character class.
 In Dominions 3: The Awakening, thaumaturgy is one of the paths of magic that can be researched.
 In the 1996 Sierra MMO The Realm Online, thaumaturgy is a branch of magic specifically dealing with healing, protection, curing poisons, and summoning good-aligned allies.
 In Jim Butcher's The Dresden Files, thaumaturgy is the creation of a magical link between an object and a person (as when using voodoo dolls).
 In The Lunar Chronicles by Marissa Meyer, thaumaturges are the bodyguards and police force of the Lunar Queen Levana.
 In Magic: The Gathering, many cards in the plane of Theros feature Thaumaturges, most notably the Battle Thaumaturge. In the planeswalker's guide to the setting, they are treated more akin to theurgists, having their magic stem from the gods.
 In Path of Exile, thaumaturgy powers the in-universe magic, and power-hungry court thaumaturgists drive the storyline.
 In Wizard101, Thaumaturges are wizards who specialize in ice magic. These wizards specialize in tanking hits, having spells that do not deal a lot of damage, but can provide shielding spells and taunt enemies, drawing them away from more important players.
 In Ultima VIII : Pagan, thaumaturgy is one of the five schools of magic along with Sorcery, Necromancy, Theurgy and Tempestry. Thaumaturgy contains miscellaneous spells of usually non-elemental nature. Its practice is not tied to one of the titans.
 In Beautiful Creatures, the book by Kami Garcia and Margaret Stohl, Ryan, a cousin of the main character's love interest, Lena, is discovered as being a Thaumaturge when she heals the main character after an accident. When asked "I'm guessing that's a fancy Caster name for healer?" Lena replies, "Something like that."
 In the Saga of the Noble Dead, thaumaturgy is one of the three disciplines of magic.
 In the SCP Foundation mythos, thaumaturgy is often invoked as a scientific term for ritual magics and interactions with nonphysical entities.
 In the universe of Kinoko Nasu's TYPE-MOON visual novel series, the word "thaumaturgy" is an accepted translation for Majutsu (魔術, lit. "demon/magic skill"; or Magecraft), which is the only form of magic available to the modern practitioner. This modern magecraft is considered inferior to actual magic, which can only be used by a very select few people.
 In Minecraft, there's a mod about thaumaturgy in which the player studies the laws of magic to manipulate the world around them, cast magic, turn matter into magical essence and channel it into other objects and tools to create powerful artifacts of defence and destruction as well as unlock the hidden secrets of the ancient Eldritch dimension of which the power originates from, to which the player must defeat many ancient evils that have been trapped there by previous Thaumaturges who were unable to defeat them. The magic is mechanical based with a mathematical like lore in which the player learns to understand through study and 'insight'.
 In Xenoblade Chronicles 3, Thaumaturge is the name of an optional class, obtained from the character Teach, who acts as a healer while dealing considerable damage to opponents.
 In Jeremy Leven's book "The Savoir and the Singing Machine: A Comedy," The Thaumaturge is the father of the present Virgin Mother, who may or may not have been responsible for the possible immaculate conception leading to the birth of "The Savoir," identified in the book simply as "She."

See also 
 :Category:Miracle workers
 Laying on of hands
 Royal touch

References

External links

 EtymologyOnLine

 
Magic (supernatural)
Types of saints